Tina Ferreira (Pando,14 May 1972) is an Uruguayan, dancer, journalist and vedette of both theater and carnival, known for performing in carnivals all around Uruguay.

She works as the lead vedette in the carnival group Serpentina in which she has worked since 2004 with José de Lima, the group's director. She has won many awards for her performances with the group. She also works as a journalist for Caras y Caretas. In 2010 she was called to work in Nito Artaza's and Miguel Ángel Cherutti's theatre, Teatro Nogaró.

References

Living people
People from Pando, Uruguay
Afro-Uruguayan
Uruguayan people of Spanish descent
Uruguayan vedettes
Uruguayan female dancers
Uruguayan journalists
Uruguayan women journalists
Uruguayan musical theatre female dancers
1972 births